Beaucarnea sanctomariana is a tree in the family Asparagaceae, native to Mexico. The species is named for the town of Santa María Chimalapa in Oaxaca.

Description
Its inflorescences feature cream-yellow flowers.

Distribution and habitat
Beaucarnea sanctomariana is endemic to Mexico, where it is confined to the Chimalapas region of the Isthmus of Tehuantepec in Oaxaca.

Conservation
Beaucarnea sanctomariana has been assessed as endangered on the IUCN Red List. It is primarily threatened by illegal harvesting for the ornamental plant trade. It is also threatened by fragmentation of its forest habitat for development. The species is not found in any protected areas.

References

sanctomariana
Endemic flora of Mexico
Flora of Oaxaca
Plants described in 2001